Sapthagiri which is also called Tirumala Hill is situated in hill town of Tirumala, near Tirupati in the Tirupati district of Andhra Pradesh, India. It comprises seven peaks, representing the seven heads of Adisesha, thus earning the name Seshachalam. The seven peaks are called Seshadri, Neeladri, Garudadri, Anjanadri, Vrushabhadri, Narayanadri, and Venkatadri. The hill is famous for the famous and one of most holy  Hindu deity Venketeswaraswamy temple. The temple is on Venkatadri (also known as Venkatachala or Venkata Hill), the seventh peak, and is also known as the "Temple of Seven Hills". The presiding deity of the temple is Lord Venkateswara, a form of the Hindu god Vishnu. Venkateswara is known by other names: Balaji, Govinda, and Srinivasa. The temple lies on the southern banks of Sri Swami Pushkarini, a holy water tank. The temple complex comprises a traditional temple building, with a number of modern queue and pilgrim lodging sites.

Seven Hills
The seven hills, also called Saptagiri, represent the Saptarishi (seven sages). They sometimes called the Sapathagiri. Hence the Lord is named Saptagirinivasa. The following are the seven hills:

Vrushabhadri – Hill named after an Asura Vrushabha who penanced on Lord Srinivasa 
Anjanadri – Hill of Lord Hanuman. it is said Hanuman's mother Anjanadevi did penance (tappassu) for 12 years.
Neeladri – Hill of Neela Devi – It is believed that hair offered by the devotees is accepted by Neela Devi. It is because of boon granted by Lord Venkateswara to Neela Devi.
Garudadri or Garudachalam – Hill of Garuda, the vahana of Lord Vishnu
Seshadri or Seshachalam – Hill of Sesha, the dasa of Lord Vishnu
Naraynadri– Hill of Narada Muni
Venkatadri – Hill of Lord Venkateswara

References

External links

Hills of Andhra Pradesh
Geography of Tirupati district